Rear Admiral Bradley Allen Fiske (June 13, 1854 – April 6, 1942) was an officer in the United States Navy who was noted as a technical innovator. During his long career, Fiske invented more than a hundred and thirty electrical and mechanical devices, with both naval and civilian uses, and wrote extensively on technical and professional issues; The New Yorker called him "one of the notable naval inventors of all time." One of the earliest to understand the revolutionary possibilities of naval aviation, he wrote a number of books of important effect in gaining a wider understanding of the modern Navy by the public. For inventing the rangefinder, he was awarded the Elliott Cresson Medal of The Franklin Institute in 1891.

Early life and career
Fiske was born in Lyons, New York on 13 June 1854 to Rev. William Allen Fiske and Susan Mathews (Bradley) Fiske. He was appointed to the United States Naval Academy from the State of Ohio in 1870, graduating four years later and receiving his commission as an Ensign in July 1875.

He also received instruction in the then-young field of torpedo warfare.

He married Josephine Harper on February 15, 1882 in New York and they had one daughter, Caroline Harper Fiske, in 1885. Josephine was the sister of publisher Henry S. Harper.

Spanish–American War and afterward
While serving in the latter, he took part in the Battle of Manila Bay on 1 May 1898.

Following the Spanish–American War, Fiske continued his service in Philippine waters on board the monitor .

Command assignments
During the years between the Spanish–American War and World War I, Fiske advanced rapidly in rank: to Lieutenant Commander in 1899, Commander in 1903, and Captain in 1907.

Flag assignments
Bradley Fiske became a Rear Admiral in August 1911, subsequently commanding three different divisions of the Atlantic Fleet as well as serving as the Secretary of the Navy's Aide for Inspections. In February 1913 he was appointed Aide for Operations, a post that later became that of Chief of Naval Operations. As Aide for Operations, Fiske forcefully advocated the creation of a Naval general staff and the elevation of the nation's preparedness for war.

On November 9, 1914, Fiske sent a memorandum to then Secretary of the Navy Josephus Daniels that the U.S. Navy was not organized for warfare: "If this country avoids war during the next five years it will be accomplished only by a happy combination of high diplomatic skill and rare good fortune," the memo said, stating the Navy was short 19,600 men from its stated table of organization. Though individual ships were well-maintained and controlled, naval administration was lacking.

Fiske resigned as Aide for Operations on April 1, 1915, and was replaced by Admiral William Shepherd Benson as the first Chief of Naval Operations.

Naval innovations

In the late 19th century, ships' guns were equipped only with open sights. Fiske, then a lieutenant on a gunboat, developed the idea of augmenting his ship's guns with a telescopic sight to improve accuracy. By 1890, he had taken out the first of several patents on his telescopic sights, which in time would be developed into the modern range finder.

In 1910, while considering the problem of defending the Philippine islands, Fiske conceived of the idea of equipping aircraft with lightweight torpedoes. Fiske worked out the mechanics of carrying and releasing an aerial torpedo from a bomber, and defined tactics that included a night-time approach so that the target ship would be less able to defend itself. Airplanes large enough to suit his purpose were not available until 1912, at which point Fiske was able to implement his design. Fiske reported in 1915 that, using this method, enemy fleets could be attacked within their own harbors, and remarked that he had invented not just a new weapon but an entirely new method of warfare.

Retirement and later years
Following a year at the Naval War College, Rear Admiral Fiske was retired upon reaching the age of 62 in June 1916. His professional activities continued into the mid-1920s, however, with service as President of the U.S. Naval Institute and several sessions of temporary duty with the Navy Department.

In 1924, Rear Admiral Bradley A. Fiske was quoted in the New York Times stating that "the Japanese and the Americans have taken attitudes that are irreconcilable [regarding the Immigration Act] and such attitudes have usually preceded wars... We are prepared for war if it does come."

Among Fiske's improvements were an improved stadimeter, helm-angle indicator, engine-room telegraphs, speed and direction indicators, a turret range finder, a gun director system, and steering telegraphs.

Rear Admiral Bradley A. Fiske died in New York City on 6 April 1942, aged 87.

Namesake

Bibliography

Books
 Electricity in Theory and Practice (1883) [written while Fiske was a lieutenant]
 American Naval Policy (1905) [written while Fiske was a commander]
 War Time in Manila (1913)
 Preparedness of the Navy (1916)
 The Navy as a Fighting Machine (1916)
 From Midshipman To Rear-Admiral (1919) [Autobiography]
 The Art of Fighting (1920)
 Invention, the Master-Key to Progress (1921)

Articles, essays, and introductions
"The Naval Profession," United States Naval Institute Proceedings, June 1907, pp. 570–73
Introduction to Textbook of Aeronautics, by Henry Woodhose (1917).
"France", in For France, by Charles Hanson Towne (1918)
Introduction to Togo and the Rise of Japanese Sea Power by Edwin A. Falk (1936)
"Electricity in Naval Life. The Steering Telegraph," The Electrical Engineer, 21 October 1896: 399-401.

Gallery

See also

 Percy Scott (contemporary innovator for the Royal Navy)

References

Sources

External links

Patents
, Means for regulating and controlling electric motors
General
 
 
 

1854 births
1942 deaths
19th-century American inventors
20th-century American inventors
American military personnel of the Spanish–American War
United States Naval Academy alumni
United States Navy rear admirals
Naval War College alumni
Burials at Arlington National Cemetery
People from Lyons, New York